Smaug is a dragon in J. R. R. Tolkien's novel The Hobbit.

Smaug may also refer to:
 Smaug (lizard), a genus of lizards
 Smaug (protein), an RNA-binding protein
 Cnemaspis smaug, a species of gecko
 Tetramorium smaug, a species of myrmicine ant
 SMAUG, a multi-user dungeon derived from DikuMUD

See also
 Smog (disambiguation)